Gregory Pakourianos (– before April 1105) was a Byzantine aristocrat and provincial governor.

In  he married a daughter (possibly named Anna) of Nikephoros Komnenos, the youngest brother of Byzantine emperor Alexios I Komnenos. On that occasion Gregory was raised to the rank of sebastos, and appointed to the governance of a province near Ohrid—either Dyrrhachium or Skopje—but he died soon after, sometime before April 1105. 

Gregory is known chiefly through the letters addressed to him by the archbishop Theophylact of Ohrid. Furthermore, in a letter by Theophylact's letter to Adrianos Komnenos, Gregory is praised as a capable and benevolent governor, who showed particular care and attention to the weak and destitute. By his wife, he had one known son, Nikephoros Pakourianos.

References

Sources
 

1080s births
1100s deaths
12th-century Byzantine people
Byzantine governors
Officials of Alexios I Komnenos
Byzantine people of Georgian descent
Sebastoi